The 2019–20 Guadeloupe Division of Honor was the 70th season of the Guadeloupe Division of Honor, the top division football competition in Guadeloupe. The regular season began on 4 September 2020 and was ended on 3 March 2021. The season culminated with the Championship Round which began on 26 March 2021 and concluded on 22 May 2021.

Defending champions, Gosier, repeated as champions, winning their second Guadeloupean title.

References

External links 
 2020–21 Guadeloupe Division of Honor at Soccerway
 2020–21 Guadeloupe Division of Honor at RSSSF

Guadeloupe Division of Honor
Guadeloupe
1
2021 in Guadeloupean sport
2021 in Guadeloupe